The 147th Pennsylvania House of Representatives District is located in Southeastern Pennsylvania and has been represented since 2023 by Donna Scheuren.

District profile
The 147th District of the Pennsylvania House of Representatives is located in Montgomery County. It is made up of the following areas:

 Douglass Township
 Green Lane
 Lower Frederick Township
 Lower Salford Township
 Marlborough Township
 New Hanover Township
 Schwenksville
 Upper Frederick Township
 Upper Pottsgrove Township
 Upper Salford Township
 West Pottsgrove Township

Representatives

Recent election results

References

External links
District map from the United States Census Bureau
Pennsylvania House Legislative District Maps from the Pennsylvania Redistricting Commission.  
Population Data for District 147 from the Pennsylvania Redistricting Commission.

Government of Montgomery County, Pennsylvania
147